Montenegro is a sovereign state in Southeastern Europe. Classified by the World Bank as an upper middle-income country, Montenegro is a member of the UN, NATO, the World Trade Organization, the Organization for Security and Co-operation in Europe, the Council of Europe, the Central European Free Trade Agreement and a founding member of the Union for the Mediterranean. Montenegro is also a candidate negotiating to join the European Union.

This is a list of notable companies in Montenegro, grouped by their Industry Classification Benchmark sector.

Notable firms 
This list includes notable companies with primary headquarters located in the country. The industry and sector follow the Industry Classification Benchmark taxonomy. Organizations which have ceased operations are included and noted as defunct.

See also 
 List of airlines of Montenegro
 List of banks in Montenegro
 List of supermarket chains in Montenegro

References 

 
Montenegro